The 1920 Victorian Football Association season was the 42nd season of the Australian rules football competition. The premiership was won by the Footscray Football Club, after it defeated Brunswick by 3 points in the final on 9 October.

Premiership 
The home-and-home season was played over eighteen rounds, with each club playing the others twice; then, the top four clubs contested a finals series under the amended Argus system to determine the premiers for the season.

Ladder

Finals

Notable events

Footscray vs North Melbourne unfinished semi-final 
The semi-final played on 25 September between Footscray and North Melbourne ended with no result, due to the circumstances of its conclusion. Footscray was leading by five points, and North Melbourne forward Considine took a mark 30 yards out from goal directly in front, at almost the exact moment that the final bell rang. Umpire Hurley paid the mark to Considine, but much of the crowd which believed the game to be over flooded onto the field, preventing Considine from taking his kick for goal after the bell. After the crowd refused to subside, the players left the field.

As Considine had been prevented from taking a potentially match-winning kick for goal, the match was declared unfinished for no result. At a meeting on Monday 27 September, the Association agreed by a 10–5 majority that the match remained undecided, and that a full replay be played the following Saturday.

The circumstances surrounding the conclusion to this semi-final were practically identical to those which surrounded the infamous 1967 Tasmanian State Premiership Final, in which North Hobart's David Collins was prevented by the crowd from taking a potential match-winning kick (a much easier kick than Considine's) after the final siren.

Other notable events 
 The Victorian Football League announced in October 1919 that it was seeking applications for a tenth team to join it for the 1920 season. It received applications from Brunswick,  and Prahran, but ultimately decided to remain at nine clubs for the season.

References

External links 
 List of VFA/VFL Premiers

Victorian Football League seasons
VFL